Great Naval Battles: Guadalcanal 1942-1943 is the second game in the Great Naval Battles series, published in 1994 by Strategic Simulations for DOS and PC-98.

Gameplay
Great Naval Battles Vol. II: Guadalcanal 1942–43 depicts naval combat in the Pacific Ocean during World War II.

Reception
Computer Gaming World in July 1994 rated Great Naval Battles Vol. 2, Guadalcanal 2.5 stars out of five. The reviewer praised the "simply superb" graphics and ability to automate or manually control systems. He criticized the inadequate documentation, reporting that he needed more than ten hours to learn how to play, and lack of replay value in the historical scenarios and "boring, ahistorical, and monotonous" campaign. The reviewer concluded that SSI should combine its graphics and detail with Gary Grigsby's Pacific Wars game design.

Reviews
PC Gamer UK - Jun, 1994
PC Gamer - Jul, 1994
ASM (Aktueller Software Markt) - May, 1994
PC Player (Germany) - May, 1994

References

1994 video games
DOS games
Naval video games
NEC PC-9801 games
Pacific War video games
Real-time strategy video games
Strategic Simulations games
Video games developed in the United States
Video games set in the Solomon Islands